Mihai Leu also known as Michael Loewe (born 13 February 1969, in Hunedoara) is a Romanian former professional boxer who competed between 1991 and 1997. He held the WBO welterweight title in 1997.

Leu retired after one title defense, against Michael Carruth, becoming the third European boxer to retire as an undefeated world champion, after Jack McAuliffe and Terry Marsh. Due to an injury, he was forced to abandon boxing but unwilling to give up the world of sports, he turned to be a rally driver. He later became a national rally champion.

Amateur highlights
He started boxing in 1977 at the Hunedoara Constructorul club. In 1981 he moved to the Hunedoara Metalul from where in 1982 he moved on to Dinamo Bucharest. During his time with Dinamo, he won the national championship four consecutive years: 1983, 1984, 1985, 1986. In 1986, he moved to Steaua Bucharest and also became part of the national team.

In 1987, he became World Junior Champion.

In total he fought 200 amateur matches, out of which he won 190.

Professional career
In 1991, he became a professional boxer in Germany (using the name Michael Loewe) and had 28 wins of 28 matches in welterweight, winning the following titles:

 1993 - Germany Intercontinental Title (which he gave up without fighting)
 1995 - WBO Intercontinental Title (which he gave up without fighting)
 1997 - WBO Welterweight champion (which he gave up due to medical reasons)

Professional boxing record

Rally career
In 1998 he started his new career at the wheel of a Ford Ka and after only three years, he managed to become Romania's rally vice-champion. He had already participated in rallying before, having made his debut in 1994, at the Banat Rally, in a Volkswagen Golf GTI.

Five years later, in 2003, he became Romania's national champion driving a Hyundai Accent WRC, with co-driver Ciprian Solomon. After failing to win another race after his championship winning year, Mihai Leu gave up competitive rallying in 2008, only to return in 2010, as team-manager of Jack Daniel's Rally Team, in the Romanian National Rally Championship (CNR).

Personal life
He is the son of Nicolae Leu, a well-known Romanian rally driver of the `70s–`80s. His brother, Victor, also made his debut in car racing in 1999, as his co-driver.

He is married and has a son Marco, born in 1993, who is a winter sportsman.

He is involved in politics along with the Partidul Conservator, despite failing to secure a place in the European Parliament, in the 2007 national elections. He works part-time as assistant at the Tibiscus University in Timișoara.

In 2014, he had colon cancer and received surgery in Bucharest and treatment in Vienna.

References

External links
Mihai Leu's Official Site
 

1969 births
Living people
Sportspeople from Hunedoara
Romanian male boxers
Welterweight boxers
World boxing champions
World welterweight boxing champions
World Boxing Organization champions
Undefeated world boxing champions
Romanian rally drivers
Romanian expatriate sportspeople in Germany